Zoya Feliksovna Svetova (born March 17, 1959) is a Russian journalist and human rights defender, producer, author of the documentary novel Innocent Found Guilty.

Biography 
In 1982 she graduated from the Maurice Thorez Moscow State Pedagogical Institute of Foreign Languages.

In 2000–2002, she was an expert at the Soros Foundation on programmes related to the development of law, the judiciary and the topic of human rights in Russia.

In 2016, she was nominated to the Mordovian PMC, but was not included in its composition.

Work in the media 

 1991—1993 —  magazine
 1993—2001 – columnist for the  newspaper
 1994—1999 – assistant to the correspondent of the Moscow bureau Radio France
 1999—2001 – assistant correspondent of the Moscow bureau of the Libération newspaper
 2001—2003 – correspondent of the Man and Circumstances section of the Novye Izvestia newspaper
 2002—2004 – representative in Moscow of the Reporters Without Borders organisation
 2003—2004 – special correspondent of the policy department of the Russkiy Kurier daily newspaper
 2004—2005 – editor of the department of internal policy of Russkiy Kurier
 since December 2009 – columnist for The New Times magazine

She published articles in the newspapers Kommersant, Russian Telegraph, Novaya Gazeta, Moskovskiye Novosti, Ogoniok, Itogi, as well as in French-language publications: Ouest-France, France Soir, La Dépêche du Midi, Le quotidien (Luxembourg).

She worked as a producer on the France 2 TV channel.

Political position 
In September 2014, she signed a statement from the December 12 Round Table demanding the withdrawal of Russian troops from Ukraine.

In September 2020, she signed a letter in support of protest actions in Belarus.

Bibliography 
2011 — Innocent Found Guilty documentary novel.

Awards 

 Laureate of the "Arbitrariness in the Law" journalism award in 2003 in the "Violation of individual rights nomination".
 Laureate of the National Press Prize of the Union of Journalists of the Russian Federation and Amnesty International for 2003 Human Rights and Strengthening Civil Society in Russia.
 Winner of the 2009 Gerd Bucerius Prize.
 Winner of the Moscow Helsinki Group Human Rights Prize in 2010.
 Laureate of the publicistic prize Libmission 2018 in the nomination "For courage in upholding liberal values" for a series of publications on the portals MBH.media and Radio Liberty, dedicated to people who have been imprisoned.
 Chevalier (Knight) of the Legion of Honour (2020).

References 

1959 births
20th-century Russian journalists
Russian human rights activists
Women human rights activists
Russian producers
Russian writers
Chevaliers of the Légion d'honneur
Living people
Free Media Awards winners